Pales  (minor planet designation: 49 Pales) is a large, dark main-belt asteroid. It was discovered by German-French astronomer Hermann Goldschmidt on 19 September 1857 from his balcony in Paris. The asteroid is named after Pales, the goddess of shepherds in Roman mythology. Since it was discovered on the same night as 48 Doris, geologist Élie de Beaumont suggested naming the two "The Twins".

The orbit of this asteroid has close to a 2:1 commensurability with the orbit of Jupiter. On 17 January 2000, this minor planet was observed occulting a 9th magnitude star from seven locations.

Pales has been studied by radar. The lightcurve shows 4 maxima and 4 minima per cycle, suggesting an irregular shape. The previously accepted period of 10.42 hours with 2 maxima and minima per cycle was proven to be wrong by Pilcher in 2016, showing that correct rotation periods still have not been found for all low-numbered asteroids.

References

External links 
 
 

Background asteroids
Pales
Pales
CG-type asteroids (Tholen)
Ch-type asteroids (SMASS)
18570919